C.R. Omanakkuttan (born February 13, 1943) is an Indian writer, humorist and cultural activist from the state of Kerala. He was born in Kottayam district
. Had his schooling at Nair Samajam High School, kottayam and his college studies at C.M.S. College, Kottayam, S.N.College, Kollam and S.B.College, Changanassery. He started as a journalist and worked in the magazines Cinema Masika, Prabhatham and Grandhalokam. Then he worked for four years in Department of Public Relations, Government of Kerala and after that joined as lecturer of Malayalam in The Majarajas College, Ernakulam and C.M.S College Kottayam. In addition to short stories and novels he has written satirical and biographical articles.
He was awarded the 2010 Kerala Sahitya Akademi Award for Humour for his book Sri Bhuthanathavilasam Nair Hotel.

His son Amal Neerad is a prominent director in the Malayalam film industry.

Works

 Omanakkadhakal
 Ezhavasivanum Varikkunthavum
 Abhinava shakunthalam 
 Shavamtheenikal
 Kumaru
 Nanu
 Kalpadu
 Father Sergius
 ThanneerThanneer
 Bhranthante Diary
 Chaplinum Basheerum Njanum
 Niram Pidippikkatha Nerukal

References 

Place of birth missing (living people)
Writers from Kerala
Indian humorists
1943 births
Living people
People from Kottayam district
Recipients of the Kerala Sahitya Akademi Award